The Revelator Collection DVD is a mix of music videos and concert footage of singer-songwriter Gillian Welch and her musical partner David Rawlings. All of the video was filmed in black and white by still photographer Mark Seliger.

The first three tracks were recorded at RCA Studio B in Nashville, Tennessee and document the recording of these songs for Welch's 2001 album, Time (The Revelator).

The remaining songs are all filmed before live audiences. Tracks 4–8 were shot at the Cat's Cradle in Carrboro, North Carolina on November 10, 2001, and Tracks 9-11 were filmed the following day at the Bijou Theater in Knoxville, Tennessee. These eight tracks include several songs from the Time (The Revelator) album, one previously unreleased Gillian Welch song, "Wichita", and several covers. The duo cover Bob Dylan's "Billy", Neil Young's "Pocahontas" and Townes Van Zandt's "White Freight Liner Blues" as well as Bill Monroe's "I'm on My Way Back to the Old Home" with Rawlings singing lead. The clip of Welch and Rawlings performing "I Want to Sing that Rock and Roll" from the concert film, Down from the Mountain is added as a bonus.

Audio of all tracks have been released online and titled Music from the Revelator Collection.

Track listing
 "Elvis Presley Blues" (Rawlings-Welch)
 "My First Lover" (Rawlings-Welch)
 "Revelator" (Rawlings-Welch)
 "April the 14th" (Rawlings-Welch)
 "Wichita" (Welch)
 "Red Clay Halo" (Rawlings-Welch)
 "Billy" (Dylan)
 "Pocahontas" (Young)
 "Revelator" (Rawlings-Welch)
 "I'm on My Way Back to the Old Home" (Monroe)
 "White Freightliner Blues" (Van Zandt)
 "I Want to Sing that Rock and Roll" (Rawlings-Welch)

Credits
 Director: Mark Seliger
 Director of Photography: Michael Garofalo
 Sound: Terry Hillman
 Project Coordinator: Norm Parenteau
 Package Design: Frank Olinsky
 Cover Photograph: Mark Seliger
 DVD Editor: Lee Tucker, Ground Zero, Nashville, Tennessee
 DVD Authoring, Encoding, and Mastering: Jeff Stabenau, Blink Digital, New York City
 DVD Producers: Gillian Welch & David Rawlings
 Gillian Welch plays a 1956 Gibson J-50
 David Rawlings plays a 1935 Epiphone Olympic
 The Box was made by Barnett and Jaffe

Tracks 1–3
 Film producer: Rhea Rupert
 Editor: Barney Miller

See also
 Time (The Revelator) (related album)
 Down from the Mountain (concert film with some of the same footage)

External links
 

2002 films
American documentary films
Concert films
Artisan Entertainment films
2000s English-language films
2000s American films